Robert Kovač (born 6 April 1974) is a Croatian professional football manager and former player who played as a centre-back. He was known for his ability with the ball and skill at dispossessing opponents. His older brother is football manager and former player Niko.

Club career

Early career 
Kovač started his career in lower league clubs Rapide Wedding and Hertha Zehlendorf before making his Bundesliga debut with 1. FC Nürnberg in 1995. Regularly featuring in the first–eleven, Kovač attracted much attention to himself and was signed at the end of the season by Leverkusen.

Bayer Leverkusen 
He spent the next five seasons in Leverkusen without any significant success, as the club did not win any trophy during that period, although they were three times Bundesliga runners–up.

Bayern Munich 
After his contract expired he went to join reigning champions of 2000–01 season and UEFA Champions League title holders, Bayern Munich. In four seasons with Bayern he won two Bundesliga titles, two German Cup titles and the 2001 Intercontinental Cup.

Juventus 
On 15 July 2005, he signed for Juventus. He was one of the few first–team players that decided to stay in Juve following its demotion to Serie B. He made a total of 35 appearances and scored one goal before he moved back to Germany, this time for Borussia Dortmund.

Borussia Dortmund 
On 1 August 2007, he signed for Borussia Dortmund, alongside another Croatian national team star, Mladen Petrić, who signed for the club two months earlier. Kovač had an unsuccessful comeback to the Bundesliga and was sold to Dinamo Zagreb at the winter transfer window of 2008–09 season.

Dinamo Zagreb 
On 29 January 2009, close to the January transfer window deadline, he signed 1 and a half year contract with Croatian champions Dinamo Zagreb. The club previously tried to sign him in the summer of 2007, but failed to meet his demands.  Borussia Dortmund were compensated with €450,000. In his debut season Kovač made 12 appearances in the league and two more in Croatian Cup. He started the 2009–10 season with a foot injury and missed all of Dinamo's matches in July and August, but returned to action at the start of the September. Kovač finished the season with a total of 22 appearances for Dinamo in all competitions, before it was officially announced on 1 June 2010 that he retired from active football.

International career
Kovač represented Croatia in two World Cups, 2002 and 2006, and has also participated at two European Championships, 2004 and 2008. At World Cup 2006 he played well in defence, however after picking up a second yellow against Japan he missed the final group match against Australia through suspension. Without Kovač, Croatia struggled in defence with his replacement Tomas committing handball for Australia's first goal via penalty kick. Croatia eventually drew 2–2 with Australia but were eliminated from the tournament. With Croatia, Leverkusen, and Bayern, Kovač was teammates with his older brother Niko Kovač. He retired from the national team in the fall of 2009, having captained the team after his brother's retirement in 2008. His final international was an October 2009 World Cup qualification match away against Kazakhstan.

Coaching career
On 21 January 2013, Igor Štimac, the head coach of the Croatia national football team, announced that Kovač, alongside his older brother Niko, would take over as the Croatia national under-21 football team head coach. From October 2013 until September 2015, he was also an assistant manager to his brother, then the head coach of the Croatia senior team.

On 1 July 2018, he became the assistant manager of Bayern Munich. Robert's older brother, Niko, brought Robert with him to Bayern when he took over as the manager of the club. On 3 November 2019, he and his older brother parted ways with the club.

In July 2020, Kovač joined AS Monaco as assistant coach, with Niko serving as manager.

Personal life
Kovač, along with his older brother Niko, was born in Berlin to a family of Bosnian Croat immigrants from Livno, Bosnia and Herzegovina. He is married to a former Croatian model and Miss World 1995 first runner-up, Anica Kovač.

Career statistics

Honours
Bayern Munich
 Bundesliga: 2002–03, 2004–05
 DFB-Pokal: 2002–03, 2004–05
 Intercontinental Cup: 2001

Juventus
 Serie B: 2006–07

Dinamo Zagreb
 Prva HNL: 2008–09
 Croatian Cup: 2008–09

References

External links
 
 
 
 
 

1974 births
Living people
Footballers from Berlin
German people of Bosnia and Herzegovina descent
German people of Croatian descent
Association football defenders
Croatian footballers
Croatia international footballers
2002 FIFA World Cup players
2006 FIFA World Cup players
UEFA Euro 2004 players
UEFA Euro 2008 players
Hertha Zehlendorf players
1. FC Nürnberg players
Bayer 04 Leverkusen players
FC Bayern Munich footballers
Juventus F.C. players
Borussia Dortmund players
GNK Dinamo Zagreb players
Bundesliga players
2. Bundesliga players
Serie A players
Serie B players
Croatian Football League players
Croatian expatriate footballers
Expatriate footballers in Italy
Croatian expatriate sportspeople in Italy
West German footballers
German expatriate sportspeople in Italy
German expatriate footballers
German expatriate sportspeople in Monaco
Croatian expatriate sportspeople in Monaco